Miss Ecuador 2012, the 62nd Miss Ecuador pageant held at Puerto Lucía Yacht Club, La Libertad, Santa Elena, Ecuador on March 16, 2012. Claudia Schiess from Galápagos crowned to her successor as Miss Ecuador 2012, Carolina Aguirre from Guayas. The winner of Miss Ecuador represented her country at Miss Universe 2012.

Results

Placements

Special Awards

Judges 

 Lenín Moreno - Vice President of Ecuador
 Roberto Warson - Manager of Yanbal
 Astrid Carolina Herrera - Miss World 1984
 Carlos Coello - Manager of TC
 Marjorie Adum - Jeweler
 Liner Rodríguez -  Manager of Coron
 Edith Arenas - Nutritionist
 Luis De Los Reyes - Manager of Renault
 Cadu Lopez - Model Manager
 Salvatore Laureano - Brazilian fashion designer

Contestants

Notes

Debuts

 Santa Elena

Returns

Last Competed in:

2010:
 Cañar
2009:
 Azuay

Withdraws

 Carchi
 Galapagos

Reality
January 9, 2012 was the first elimination where Michelle Sosa from Santa Elena was eliminated due to lack of documents necessary to compete in the Miss Ecuador pageant. The judges were: Ing. Andriana Loor, Mrs. Maria del Carmen de Aguayo, and Mrs. Marla Manseco.
January 16, 2012 was the second elimination where Karen Vélez from Loja was eliminated due lack of compromise with coaches of the pageant. The judges were: Dr. Miguel Lebed, M. Antonio Sapúlveda, and M. Eliberto Rodríguez.
January 23, 2012 was the third elimination where Johanna Sacoto from Cañar was eliminated for missing some courses in the reality Road to Miss Ecuador 2012. The judges are: Dr. Nelson Estrella, Dra. Mariana Mosquera, Dr. Ricardo Vargas, and Dra. Edith Arenas.
January 30, 2012 was the fourth elimination where Cecilia Chiavassa from Guayas was eliminated by her own decision due she had an exam at her university the same day of the elimination.

Crossovers
Ana Gabriela Barahona competed in Reina de Quito 2007, she is Reina de la Universidad Tecnológica Equinoccial de Quito, and Reina de la Policía Nacional.
Estefanía Realpe competed in Reina de Quito 2007, where she was Miss Amistad (2nd Runner-up).
Cipriana Correia was Reina de Esmeraldas 2008, and Virreina de Mi Tierra 2008.
Karen Vélez was Señorita Fundación de Loja 2009, and competed in Elite Model Ecuador 2009.
Lidia León was Miss Turismo Ecuador 2009.
Cecilia Chiavassa competed in Reina de Guayaquil 2010.
Christel Oyague competed in Reina de Guayaquil 2010.
Tatiana Loor competed in Reina de Santo Domingo 2010, she was Miss Solidaridad (2nd Runner-up).
Kimberly Bravo competed in Miss Model of the World 2010 where she placed on top 26.
Nicole Cavallos competed in Miss Teen World 2010.
Steffany Tamayo competed in Miss Pacífico Ecuador 2011, she was 1st Runner-up.
Johanna Sacoto was Virreina de La Troncal, also she competed in Reina de la Feria Nacional de la Minería 2011.
Sulay Castillo competed in Reina de Mundial de la Rosa 2011.

References

External links
Official Miss Ecuador website

2012 beauty pageants
Beauty pageants in Ecuador
Miss Ecuador